Phase Six of the Marvel Cinematic Universe (MCU) is a group of American superhero films produced by Marvel Studios based on characters that appear in publications by Marvel Comics. Phase Six features all of the Marvel Studios productions set to be released starting from late 2024 to mid-2026, with Walt Disney Studios Motion Pictures distributing the films. The first film in the phase will be Deadpool 3, scheduled for release in November 2024. Kevin Feige produces every film in this phase, alongside producers Ryan Reynolds and Shawn Levy for Deadpool 3.

The films of the phase include Deadpool 3 starring Ryan Reynolds, Fantastic Four, and the ensembles Avengers: The Kang Dynasty and Avengers: Secret Wars. Two unannounced films are set for release in 2025, and one in 2026. Phase Six, along with Phase Four and Phase Five, constitutes The Multiverse Saga.

Development 
By April 2014, Marvel Studios President Kevin Feige said that additional storylines for the Marvel Cinematic Universe (MCU) were planned through 2028. At San Diego Comic-Con in July 2019, Feige announced Marvel Studios was developing a Fantastic Four film for the MCU. Ryan Reynolds confirmed in December 2019 that a third Deadpool film after 20th Century Fox's Deadpool (2016) and Deadpool 2 (2018) was in development at Marvel Studios, with his production company Maximum Effort co-producing the film. Fantastic Four was formally confirmed in December 2020; the film was believed to be a part of Phase Four at that time. In April 2022, Feige said he and Marvel Studios were on a creative retreat to plan and discuss the MCU films for the following 10 years, and in June 2022, said information on the next saga of the MCU would be provided in the following months, with Marvel Studios being a "little more direct" on their future plans to provide audiences with "the bigger picture [so they] can see a tiny, tiny bit more of the roadmap" following the clues included during Phase Four.

At Marvel Studios' San Diego Comic-Con panel in July 2022, Feige announced that Fantastic Four would be the first film of Phase Six. He also announced that the phase would conclude with two ensemble films, Avengers: The Kang Dynasty and Avengers: Secret Wars, both to be released in 2025, and that Phase Six, along with Phase Four and Phase Five, would be part of The Multiverse Saga. Feige noted that while not all projects in Phase Six or the previous two would directly tie into the larger multiverse storyline, the various storylines that would weave together leading into Secret Wars was "a whole new aspect to the MCU". In September, Reynolds announced that Deadpool 3 would be released on September 6, 2024, as the first film in Phase Six. In October, Marvel Studios delayed the Phase Five film Blade to the September 2024 slot, and pushed back the releases of Deadpool 3, Fantastic Four, and Avengers: Secret Wars as a result. In early February 2023, Disney CEO Bob Iger announced that the company would be re-evaluating the volume of content it output as a way to cut costs over the next few years. Shortly after, when reflecting on the amount of Disney+ content released for Phase Four in a short time frame, Feige anticipated that Marvel Studios would look to space out the releases of the Phase Five and Six Disney+ series or put fewer out each year "so they can each get a chance to shine".

Marvel Studios has three unannounced films set for release on July 25 and November 7, 2025, and February 13, 2026.

Films

Deadpool 3 (2024) 

After the acquisition of 21st Century Fox by Disney was announced in December 2017, Disney CEO Bob Iger said Ryan Reynolds would reprise his role as Wade Wilson / Deadpool from 20th Century Fox's R-rated X-Men films Deadpool (2016) and Deadpool 2 (2018) in the PG-13 rated Marvel Cinematic Universe (MCU). By December 2019, Reynolds confirmed a third Deadpool film was in development at Marvel Studios, with Wendy Molyneux and Lizzie Molyneux-Logelin writing the film by November 2020, when Reynolds' involvement and the film's R-rating were confirmed. In January 2021, Kevin Feige confirmed the film's MCU setting. In March 2022, Rhett Reese and Paul Wernick were hired to return from the first two films to rewrite the screenplay, while Shawn Levy was revealed to be directing. Reynolds and Levy also produce, with Reynolds doing so through his production company Maximum Effort. Filming is scheduled to begin in May 2023, in London. Deadpool 3 is scheduled to be released on November 8, 2024.

Hugh Jackman will appear as James "Logan" Howlett / Wolverine, reprising the role from the X-Men film series.

Fantastic Four (2025) 

At San Diego Comic-Con in July 2019, Feige announced Marvel Studios was developing a Fantastic Four film for the MCU, with Jon Watts announced as the director in December 2020. Watts stepped down in April 2022 to take a break from superhero projects. By late August, Matt Shakman, who directed the Marvel Studios Disney+ series WandaVision (2021), was in early talks to direct the film, with Feige confirming him as the director the following month at the D23 Expo. Later in September, Jeff Kaplan and Ian Springer were revealed to be writing the screenplay. Filming is scheduled to begin in early 2024. Fantastic Four is scheduled to be released on February 14, 2025.

Avengers: The Kang Dynasty (2025) 

At San Diego Comic-Con in July 2022, Marvel Studios announced Avengers: The Kang Dynasty, followed shortly after with the confirmation of Destin Daniel Cretton as director. In September, Ant-Man and the Wasp: Quantumania (2023) writer Jeff Loveness was revealed to be writing the screenplay. Jonathan Majors will reprise his role as Kang the Conqueror. Avengers: The Kang Dynasty is scheduled to be released on May 2, 2025.

Avengers: Secret Wars (2026) 
At San Diego Comic-Con in July 2022, Marvel Studios announced Avengers: Secret Wars. In October, Michael Waldron was revealed to be writing the screenplay, after previously serving as head writer for the first season of Loki (2021) and the writer of Doctor Strange in the Multiverse of Madness (2022). Majors will reprise his role as Kang. Avengers: Secret Wars is scheduled to be released on May 1, 2026.

Recurring cast and characters

References 

 
2024 beginnings
Phase 6